Khodaabad-e Bala (also Romanized as Khodāābād-e Bālā; also known as Khodāābād-e ‘Olyā) is a village in Nasrabad Rural District, in the Central District of Taft County, Yazd Province, Iran. At the 2006 census, its population was 16, in 8 families.

References 

Populated places in Taft County